Grieskirchen is a town in Austria. It is capital of the Grieskirchen district of Upper Austria, in the Trattnachtal valley.

Notable people
 Franz Födermayr (1933–2020), musicologist, was born in the town.
 Otto Prechtler (1813–1881), dramatist and librettist, was born in the town.
 Ferdinand von Sammern-Frankenegg (1897–1944), SS functionary

Population

References

Cities and towns in Grieskirchen District